Malyye Karkaly (Kese Kärkäle) is a rural locality (a selo) in Bolshekarkalinksy Selsoviet, Miyakinsky District, Bashkortostan, Russia. The population was 196 as of 2010. There are 4 streets.

Geography 
Malyye Karkaly is located 31 km southeast of Kirgiz-Miyaki (the district's administrative centre) by road. Bolshiye Karkaly is the nearest rural locality.

References 

Rural localities in Miyakinsky District